KAZC (89.3 FM) is a radio station licensed to Dickson, Oklahoma, United States. The station is currently owned by The Chickasaw Nation.

History
This station was assigned call sign KAZC on February 6, 2009.

References

External links

AZC
Carter County, Oklahoma
Radio stations established in 1973
1973 establishments in Oklahoma